Luigi Gilardi (12 August 1897 – 21 July 1987) was an Italian cyclist. He competed in the men's 50km event at the 1920 Summer Olympics.

References

External links
 

1897 births
1987 deaths
People from Pezzana
Italian male cyclists
Olympic cyclists of Italy
Cyclists at the 1920 Summer Olympics
Cyclists from Piedmont
Sportspeople from the Province of Vercelli